The River Doe is a river in North Yorkshire, England. The river's source is near God's Bridge close to the settlement of Chapel-le-Dale and flows through Twisleton in a south-westerly direction to Ingleton, where it meets the River Twiss to form the River Greta. The river forms part of the River Lune system that flows into the Irish Sea.

Course
 
The source of the river is found at a place named God's Bridge where Chapel Beck disappears underground and the Doe begins. The river flows south west, fed by a number of small unnamed springs on the valley sides. The first named tributary is Light Water Spring which feeds north west into the river near a disused quarry. Near Twisleton Dale House, the river can be crossed by some stepping stones at a fording point as well as some  later near the disused granite quarry. Further down stream near Twisleton Hall there are another set of stepping stones at a fording point just above Beezley Falls. After flowing under a footbridge, there are another set of falls, Snow Falls, just below the quarry which is operated by Hanson. The river continues past several disused quarries and a footbridge until it reaches the town of Ingleton where it forms a confluence with the River Twiss.

Falls

These falls consist of a series of cascades, including the triple spout, running through Baxengyhll Gorge. Rival Falls  has a plunge pool known as the Black Hole.

Geology

The main rock of the river valley is turbidite sandstone with some siltstone which are prevalent in the waterfalls and plunge pools. These lay on a bed of Precambrian sedimentary rock which show evidence of its oceanic origins in the ripple and folding marks on exposed surfaces.

Habitat

The river is home to Brown trout. From Beezley falls to Snow falls, the sides of the gorge are lined with a variety of trees and shrubs.

Gallery

References

Doe, River
2Doe